In most computer programming languages a do while loop is a control flow statement that executes a block of code and then either repeats the block or exits the loop depending on a given boolean condition.

The do while construct consists of a process symbol and a condition. First the code within the block is executed. Then the condition is evaluated. If the condition is true the code within the block is executed again. This repeats until the condition becomes false. 

Do while loops check the condition after the block of code is executed. This control structure can be known as a post-test loop. This means the do-while loop is an exit-condition loop. However a while loop will test the condition before the code within the block is executed. 

This means that the code is always executed first and then the expression or test condition is evaluated. This process is repeated as long as the expression evaluates to true. If the expression is false the loop terminates. A while loop sets the truth of a statement as a necessary condition for the code's execution. A do-while loop provides for the action's ongoing execution until the condition is no longer true.

It is possible and sometimes desirable for the condition to always evaluate to be true. This creates an infinite loop. When an infinite loop is created intentionally there is usually another control structure that allows termination of the loop. For example a break statement would allow termination of an infinite loop.

Some languages may use a different naming convention for this type of loop. For example, the Pascal and Lua languages have a "repeat until" loop, which continues to run until the control expression is true and then terminates. In contrast a "while" loop runs while the control expression is true and terminates once the expression becomes false.

Equivalent constructs
do {
    do_work();  
} while (condition);

is equivalent to

do_work();

while (condition) {
    do_work();
}

In this manner, the do ... while loop saves the initial "loop priming" with do_work(); on the line before the while loop.

As long as the continue statement is not used, the above is technically equivalent to the following (though these examples are not typical or modern style used in everyday computers):

while (true) {
   do_work();
   if (!condition) break;
}

or

LOOPSTART:
    do_work();
    if (condition) goto LOOPSTART;

Demonstrating do while loops

These example programs calculate the factorial of 5 using their respective languages' syntax for a do-while loop.

ActionScript 3
var counter: int = 5;
var factorial: int = 1;

do {
    factorial *= counter--; /* Multiply, then decrement. */
} while (counter > 0);

trace(factorial);

Ada

with Ada.Integer_Text_IO;

procedure Factorial is
    Counter   : Integer := 5;
    Factorial : Integer := 1;
begin
    loop
        Factorial := Factorial * Counter;
        Counter   := Counter - 1;
        exit when Counter = 0;
    end loop;

    Ada.Integer_Text_IO.Put (Factorial);
end Factorial;

BASIC
Early BASICs (such as GW-BASIC) used the syntax WHILE/WEND.  Modern BASICs such as PowerBASIC provide both WHILE/WEND and DO/LOOP structures, with syntax such as DO WHILE/LOOP, DO UNTIL/LOOP, DO/LOOP WHILE, DO/LOOP UNTIL, and DO/LOOP (without outer testing, but with a conditional EXIT LOOP somewhere inside the loop).  Typical BASIC source code:

Dim factorial As Integer
Dim counter As Integer

factorial = 1
counter = 5

Do 
    factorial = factorial * counter
    counter = counter - 1
Loop While counter > 0

Print factorial

C#
int counter = 5;
int factorial = 1;

do
{
    factorial *= counter--; /* Multiply, then decrement. */
} while (counter > 0);

System.Console.WriteLine(factorial);

C
int counter = 5;
int factorial = 1;

do {
    factorial *= counter--; /* Multiply, then decrement. */
} while (counter > 0);

printf("factorial of 5 is %d\n", factorial);

Do-while(0) statements are also commonly used in C macros as a way to wrap multiple statements into a regular (as opposed to compound) statement. It is recommended in CERT C Coding Standard rule PRE10-C.

C++
int counter = 5;
int factorial = 1;

do {
    factorial *= counter--;
} while (counter > 0);

std::cout << "factorial of 5 is "<< factorial << std::endl;

CFScript
factorial = 1;
count = 10;

do {
    factorial *= count--;
} while (count > 1);

writeOutput(factorial);

D
int counter = 5;
int factorial = 1;

do {
    factorial *= counter--; // Multiply, then decrement.
} while (counter > 0);

writeln("factorial of 5 is ", factorial);

Fortran
With legacy FORTRAN 77 there is no DO-WHILE construct but the same effect can be achieved with GOTO:

      INTEGER CNT,FACT
      CNT=5
      FACT=1
    1 CONTINUE
      FACT=FACT*CNT
      CNT=CNT-1
      IF (CNT.GT.0) GOTO 1
      PRINT*,FACT
      END

Fortran 90 and later does not have a do-while construct either, but it does have a while loop construct which uses the keywords "do while" and is thus actually the same as the for loop.

program FactorialProg
    integer :: counter = 5
    integer :: factorial = 1
    
    factorial = factorial * counter
    counter = counter - 1
    
    do while (counter > 0) ! Truth value is tested before the loop
        factorial = factorial * counter
        counter = counter - 1
    end do
    
    print *, factorial
end program FactorialProg

Java
int counter = 5;
int factorial = 1;

do {
    factorial *= counter--; /* Multiply, then decrement. */
} while (counter > 0);

System.out.println("The factorial of 5 is " + factorial);

//============================================//
// The below function does the same as above. //
//============================================//

int counter = 5;
int factorial = 1;

while (counter > 0){
    factorial *= counter--; /* Multiply, then decrement. */
}

System.out.println("The factorial of 5 is " + factorial);

JavaScript
let counter = 5; // Declaring two variables, counter and factorial 
let factorial = 1; 

do {
    factorial *= counter--; //What will be looped
} while (counter > 0); //The looping conditions

console.log(factorial); //Showing the result

Kotlin
var counter = 5
var factorial = 1
//These line of code is almost the same as the above JavaScript codes, the only difference is the keyword that shows the results
do {
    factorial *= counter--
} while (counter > 0)

println("Factorial of 5 is $factorial")

Pascal

Pascal does not have a do/while; instead, it has a repeat/until. As mentioned in the introduction, one can consider a repeat/until to be equivalent to a 'do code while not expression' construct.

factorial := 1;
counter := 5;
repeat
   factorial := factorial * counter;
   counter := counter - 1; // In Object Pascal one may use dec (counter);
until counter = 0;

PHP
$counter = 5;
$factorial = 1;

do {
    $factorial *= $counter--;
} while ($counter > 0);

echo $factorial;

PL/I
The PL/I DO statement subsumes the functions of the post-test loop (do until), the pre-test loop (do while), and the for loop. All functions can be included in a single statement. The example shows only the "do until" syntax.

declare counter   fixed initial(5);
declare factorial fixed initial(1);

do until(counter <= 0);
    factorial = factorial * counter;
    counter = counter - 1;
end;

put(factorial);

Python
Python lacks a specific do while flow control construct. However, the equivalent may be constructed out of a while loop with a break.

counter = 5
factorial = 1

while True:
    factorial *= counter
    counter -= 1
    
    if counter == 0:
        break
    
print(factorial)

Racket
In Racket, as in other Scheme implementations, a "named-let" is a popular way to implement loops:

#lang racket
(define counter 5)
(define factorial 1)
(let loop
    (set! factorial (* factorial counter))
    (set! counter (sub1 counter))
    (when (> counter 0) (loop)))
(displayln factorial)

Compare this with the first example of the while loop example for Racket. Be aware that a named let can also take arguments.

Racket and Scheme also provide a proper do loop.
(define (factorial n)
    (do ((counter n (- counter 1))
        (result 1 (* result counter)))
    ((= counter 0) result) ; Stop condition and return value.
    ; The body of the do-loop is empty.
    ))

Ruby
counter = 10
factorial = 2

begin
  factorial *= counter
  counter -= 2
end while counter > 1

puts factorial

Smalltalk
| counter factorial |
counter := 5.
factorial := 1.

[counter > 0] whileTrue: 
    [factorial := factorial * counter.
    counter := counter - 1].

Transcript show: factorial printString

Swift
Swift 2.x and later:
var counter = 5
var factorial = 1

repeat {
    factorial *= counter
    counter -= 1
} while counter > 0

print(factorial)
Swift 1.x:
var counter = 5
var factorial = 1

do {
    factorial *= counter
    counter -= 1
} while counter > 0

println(factorial)

Visual Basic .NET
Dim counter As Integer = 5
Dim factorial As Integer = 1

Do
    factorial *= counter
    counter -= 1 
Loop While counter > 0

Console.WriteLine(factorial)

See also
 Control flow
 For loop
 Foreach
 Repeat loop (disambiguation)
 While loop

References

External links
 do {...} while (0) in C macros

Control flow
Articles with example Ada code
Articles with example C code
Articles with example Fortran code
Articles with example Pascal code
Articles with example Racket code
Articles with example Python (programming language) code

de:Schleife (Programmierung)#Do-While-Schleife